Reid & Reid, also known as Reid Brothers, was an American architectural and engineering firm that was active from 1880 to 1932. Established in Indiana by Canadian immigrants, the firm moved to the West Coast and became was the most prominent firm in San Francisco, California in the late 19th and early 20th centuries.

History 
Brothers James William Reid (1851-1943), Merritt Jonathan Reid (1855-1932), and Watson Elkinah Reid (1858–1944) were born in Harvey, Albert County, New Brunswick, Canada, three of the eight children of Lucinda Robinson and William James Reid, a farmer and house joiner. James worked as a house joiner and studied industrial arts at the Lowell School of Practical Design in Boston before attending McGill University in Montreal and the Massachusetts Institute of Technology. He also studied at the Ecole des Beaux-Arts in Paris 1874.

before graduating from the Massachusetts Institute of Technology and École des Beaux-Arts in Paris. Merritt also graduated from École des Beaux-Arts.,

In the late 19th–century, James and Merritt immigrated to Evansville, Indiana from and worked at the architectural firm of Boy and Brickley. In 1879, they purchased the contracts from Boyd & Brickley and opened Reid Brothers.

One of their early clients was the Terre Haute Railroad which helped develop their reputation. Their most notable work in Evansville is the Willard Library which was executed in the Gothic revival style. Banker Aaron Guard Cloud commissioned two projects with the Reid Brothers: the Cloud State Bank in the Second Empire and French Baroque style and his private home which are both in McLeansboro, Illinois.

In 1886, the brothers moved to the San Diego, California with the client Charles T. Hinde to design the Hotel Del Coronado for the Coronado Beach Company. Although the Coronado Beach Company was not financially successful, the project helped build the West Coast reputation of the Reid Brothers. Their younger brother, Watson Elkinah Reid moved to California and joined the firm around 1888. Watson attended Mount Allison University in Sackville, New Brunswick, Canada for two years and worked as a house joiner. He served as the supervising architect for the Hotel Del Coronado.

James and Merritt became Fellows of the American Institute of Architects in 1889. That same year, Merritt moved to San Francisco to open an office, followed shortly by James. Watson remained in San Diego to run that office. In 1891, Watson was joined by William Sterling Hebbard, an architect who had trained in Chicago.

In 1892, the Reid Brothers were hired to design the Portland, Oregon newspaper's Oregonian Building. It was the first steel-frame building west of Chicago.

In 1894, Mrs. M. L. Selfridge hired the firm to design six houses on the corner of California and Pierce in San Francisco.

Newspaperman Claus Spreckels hired them to design a headquarters for The San Francisco Call in 1895. Architect Charles William Dickey joined the firm's San Francisco office from 1895 to 1896. He was from Oakland but had attended the Massachusetts Institute of Technology. They also hired draftsman John Walter Dolliver as a designer; draftsman Emile Schroeder Lemme, and architect Albert L. Farr.

Completed in 1897, the Call Building was the tallest building west of Chicago at 315 feet. The top of the Call Building was a four-story dome; there, the Reid Brothers established their new office on the eighteenth floor. The Call Building dominated the San Francisco skyline and became its "most recognizable" landmark. Spreckels continued to work with Reid & Reid for other projects including the Spreckels Car House, several family mansions, and Spreckels Temple of Music, a music stand that Spreckels donated to Golden Gate Park.

In 1892, Watson Reid left the firm and moved back to New Brunswick. Watson Reid was commissioned to build what's known as Victoria Manor, completed in 1893 for Lt. Gov. Abner Reid McClellan.  Hebbard then became head of the San Diego office and oversaw its work.

In addition to the Spreckels Temple of Music, Reid & Reid designed the Caretaker's Cottage at Golden Gate Park. In 1908, they also designed a Stadium at the Polo Fields for Golden Gate Park, but the project ended early in the construction phase. Only a small section of the bleachers was constructed.

Reid & Reid was hired to design the Fairmont Hotel on Nob Hill in 1902. Although damaged by the 1906 San Francisco earthquake, the hotel opened a year later, on April 18, 1907. They also designed the First Congregational Church, the W. & J. Sloane Building, and two Hale Brothers Co. department stores. They also created the third version of Cliff House.

They also designed many mansions in the Pacific Heights, although many were lost in the 1906 San Francisco earthquake and fire. Two surviving houses located at 2083 and 2099 Pacific were built for Spreckels as wedding gifts for his son. Those survive today, along with 1919 Sacramento, 2770 Broadway, and  2646 Vallejo. Another residential project was the Classical Revival Irwin mansion which was located at 2190 Washington.

Reid & Reid designed numerous movie theaters in San Francisco, including the Alexandria Theatre, the Balboa Theatre, the Coliseum Theatre, the Metropolitan, and the New Mission Theatre. They also designed the Golden State Theatre in Monterey, the Grand Lake Theater in Oakland, the New Sequoia Theater Building in Redwood City, and Sequoia Theatre in Mill Valley, California

In 1929, they designed a 20-unit cooperative apartment building in Russian Hill. James moved into the apartment building, living there until he died in 1943.

When Merritt died on February 4, 1932, James retired and closed the firm.

Selected projects

References

Further reading
Cynthia Barwick Malinick, "The Lives and Works of the Reid Brothers, Architects 1852-1943". (M.A. thesis, University of San Diego, 1992)

 
Defunct architecture firms based in California
Companies established in 1879
Canadian architects